Oxycera pardalina, the hill soldier, is a European species of soldier fly.

Description
Body length 4.0 to 5.0 mm. Black. Mesonotum only slightly glossy. Basal segments of antennae yellow, the third segment is dark brown. Scutellum with two black spots near base. Abdomen: second, third and fourth tergites with rounded side spots; Fourth tergite band complete or closely separated in the middle, fifth with a large rounded median spot. Female: yellow stripe on face along anterior margin of eyes continued onto frons.

Biology
The habitat is hilly country, small calcareous streams in scrub or at a woodland edge. The flight period is from early June to early August,

Distribution
Northern Central and Southern Europe.

References

External links
Images representing Oxycera pardalina at Bold

Stratiomyidae
Diptera of Europe
Insects described in 1822